Glynn Nicholas is an Australian actor, comedian, director, writer and producer.

Busking and early career
Glynn Nicholas began his career as a busker while travelling through Europe in 1977. His act consisted of singing and playing up to three instruments at the same time. Over time his focus shifted to include physical comedy, magic, mime and audience participation. During the late 1970s and early '80s he busked in USA, Australia, and Europe. He often played in Adelaide, and became renowned locally for the large crowds of many hundreds as he entertained in the central shopping precinct, Rundle Mall, which had recently been closed to traffic.

In 1982, he studied mime in Adelaide with Zora Semberova, to whom he attributes his success. He also studied circus skills at San Francisco's Hayward College and performed regularly at Pier 39.

In 1986 he was crowned National Champion at the Australian Busking Championships.

Television career
Nicholas first appeared on Australian television as a presenter on Channel 9's children's show Here's Humphrey, performing songs, dances, stories and games with a large pant-less mute bear. In 1991, his album Glynn Nicholas & The Funky Fossils: The Dinosaur Album was nominated for an ARIA Award for Best Children's Album.

Off air he developed a character called Paté Biscuit, a parody of another presenter on Fat Cat, Patsy Biscoe. He mimicked her distinctive bob haircut, sing-song voice and 'school-prefect' manner but added cruelty, blood, and a naughty hand puppet called Bongo, to the juvenile story-telling.

In 1989, Paté Biscuit found a ready audience on the ABC's new comedy show The Big Gig, where Nicholas had a regular spot. In one episode, the real Patsy Biscoe was seen presenting The Big Gig show with Bongo, having tied Paté Biscuit up. In 1990, Nicholas took over from Wendy Harmer as host of The Big Gig for two seasons.

In 1991, Angus and Robertson published his book Bedtime Stories with Paté Biscuit, which sold 18,000 copies.

In 1996, Nicholas co-produced a surreal ten-part comedy series with the ABC, The Glynn Nicholas Show. It was written by Nicholas and fellow Australian comedian Shaun Micallef.

Theatre career
Since 1992 Nicholas has focussed on writing, producing and performing live comedy. These include several live shows ranging from the solo Glynn with a why? and Crossing the Line, to ensemble pieces like Scat and all that "Wrung Out," "Kissing Frogs", "Pumping Irony" and the often reprised Certified Male written with his regular artistic collaborator Scott Rankin.

Other writing credits include Kissing Frogs  (1991-3) and Leaves Falling at Midnight and co-writer of the book for "Eurobeat - almost Eurovision" (2006-2009). which he also directed and produced.

He also turned his hand to Shakespeare for the Melbourne Theatre Company's production of The Comedy of Errors, played Major-General Stanley in opera in Essgee Entertainment's 1994 production of The Pirates of Penzance, and in the variety productions The Vaudeville Extravaganza (1994) and Oh Come All Ye Stressful  (2005).
  
In the 2000s his Glynn Nicholas Group entertainment company was producing and touring several shows internationally including Certified Male, and the musical Eurobeat: Almost Eurovision directed by Nicholas, which was the top-selling show of the 2007 Edinburgh Festival Fringe and was named the best musical production at the inaugural Music Theatre Matters awards.

References

External links
Glynn Nicholas' Web site

Ovations Speakers Bureau

Living people
1952 births
Australian male film actors
Australian male television actors
Australian buskers
Australian mimes
English emigrants to Australia